General Hastings may refer to:

Daniel H. Hastings (1849–1903), Pennsylvania State Militia major general
Sir Charles Hastings, 1st Baronet (1752–1823), British Army general

See also
Francis Rawdon-Hastings, 1st Marquess of Hastings (1754−1826), British Army general
Attorney General Hastings (disambiguation)